Rhodacaroides is a genus of mites in the family Ologamasidae. There are about 10 described species in Rhodacaroides.

Species
These 10 species belong to the genus Rhodacaroides:
 Rhodacaroides aegyptiacus Willmann, 1959
 Rhodacaroides brevispiritus Karg, 1977
 Rhodacaroides calidus Karg, 1977
 Rhodacaroides coniunctus Karg, 1977
 Rhodacaroides costai (Sheals, 1962)
 Rhodacaroides crinitus Karg, 1979
 Rhodacaroides leptinochaetus (Ma, 2005)
 Rhodacaroides levis Karg, 1977
 Rhodacaroides minyaspis Lee, 1973
 Rhodacaroides unguellus Karg, 1979

References

Ologamasidae